Jake Bond (born July 4, 1992) is a retired American professional soccer player.

Career

College 
Bond played college soccer at Quincy University from 2011-2014, earning Great Lakes Valley Conference All-Conference Second Team and All-Conference Third Team honors in his four seasons there.

PDL 
While at Quincy University, Bond also played for Premier Development League team St. Louis Lions during the 2014 season. After graduating from college, Bond signed with PDL team Kitsap Pumas in 2015, scoring a goal during their First Round match of the 2015 U.S. Open Cup against NPSL club FC Tacoma 253.

Professional 
After spending time training with the team as a trialist over the previous year, Bond signed with USL club Saint Louis FC on March 16, 2016. He made his debut for the club on April 9, coming on as a substitute during a match against the Oklahoma City Energy.

Bond was released by Saint Louis FC on November 9, 2016.

On March 16, 2017, Bond signed with United Soccer League side Harrisburg City Islanders.

References

External links 
 Quincy University Bio

1992 births
Living people
American soccer players
Association football defenders
Quincy Hawks men's soccer players
St. Louis Lions players
Kitsap Pumas players
Saint Louis FC players
Penn FC players
USL League Two players
USL Championship players
Soccer players from Missouri
People from O'Fallon, Missouri